Dictya atlantica is a species of marsh fly in the family Sciomyzidae.

References

Further reading

 Diptera.info
 

Sciomyzidae
Insects described in 1954